Eric Andrew Wright (born July 24, 1985) is a former American football cornerback in the National Football League (NFL). He was drafted by the Cleveland Browns in the second round of the 2007 NFL Draft. He played college football at USC and UNLV.

Wright also played for the Detroit Lions, Tampa Bay Buccaneers, and San Francisco 49ers.

College career

USC Trojans
Wright attended USC for two years before attending UNLV. After being redshirted his first year, he was a starter his second year, and started in the 2005 Orange Bowl, where he recorded four tackles and an interception.

UNLV Rebels
Wright transferred to UNLV after being expelled by USC. Police found 136 tablets of Ecstasy and GHB in Wright's apartment while investigating a sexual assault allegation against Wright. Wright sat out the 2005 season due to NCAA transfer guidelines. Wright played one year at UNLV before deciding to declare for the NFL Draft. He was a university studies major.

Professional career

Cleveland Browns
Wright was drafted by the Cleveland Browns in the second round (53rd overall) of the 2007 NFL Draft. The Browns acquired the pick from the Dallas Cowboys to select Wright. While he was a projected first round pick, he fell to the second round due to his troubled college past.

In Wright's first season with the Browns, he started 13 of 16 games. He recorded his first career interception on October 14, 2007, against Miami Dolphins quarterback Cleo Lemon. He won his first Defensive Player of the Week award after his performance during week 6 of the 2008 NFL season against the New York Giants, where he had a 94-yard interception return for a touchdown.

Detroit Lions
On July 29, 2011, Wright signed with the Detroit Lions. During his one season for the Lions, he started all 16 games and recorded 74 tackles and four interceptions.

Tampa Bay Buccaneers
On March 14, 2012, Wright signed a five-year, $37.5 million contract with the Tampa Bay Buccaneers.

On July 19, 2013, Wright was traded from the Tampa Bay Buccaneers to the San Francisco 49ers for a conditional late-round 2014 draft pick . After he failed his team physical, the trade was voided causing his rights to revert to the Buccaneers who subsequently released him.

San Francisco 49ers
On August 8, 2013, Wright signed a one-year deal with the San Francisco 49ers. On August 27, 2013, he was placed on the reserve/non-football injury list.

On June 17, 2014, Wright announced his retirement from the NFL.

References

External links
 
 Tampa Bay Buccaneers bio
 UNLV Rebels bio
 USC Trojans bio

1985 births
Living people
American football cornerbacks
Cleveland Browns players
Detroit Lions players
San Francisco 49ers players
Tampa Bay Buccaneers players
UNLV Rebels football players
USC Trojans football players
Players of American football from San Francisco